The 1989 Italy rugby union tour of Ireland was a series of matches played between December 1988 and January 1989 in Ireland by Italy national rugby union team.

It was an historical tour because the match against Ireland was the first official and "full international" test match for Italy against the national team of one of "Home Unions"

Results 
Scores and results list Italy's points tally first.

References 
 

1988 rugby union tours
1989 rugby union tours
1988–89 in Italian rugby union
1988–89 in Irish rugby union
1988–89 in European rugby union
1988
1988